Fabian Michael Wadel (born 18 May 1963), known professionally as Fabian Tassano, is an economist and author, known for his radical views on the medical profession, and for his critique of ideological aspects of modern culture.

Biography
Tassano was born in Munich to German parents. He changed his original family name of Wadel to Tassano on the marriage of his mother to Michael Tassano, a Major in the British Army. He has lived in the United Kingdom as a British citizen since 1973. In 2003, his mother's marriage to Michael Tassano having been annulled, he formally reverted to the surname Wadel, while maintaining the name Fabian Tassano for publications.

Tassano studied Natural Sciences at Churchill College, Cambridge, specialising in Physics and Philosophy of Science.  He graduated with a First in 1984, winning the Bronowski Prize.

In 1991 he qualified as a Chartered Accountant, having trained first at Grant Thornton and subsequently at KPMG Peat Marwick.  He came tenth nationally in the Institute of Chartered Accountants' qualifying exam. He also qualified as a chartered tax accountant with the Institute of Taxation.

From 1992 to 2000 he was first a postgraduate student, and subsequently college lecturer in economics, at the University of Oxford. He carried out research on vertical integration policy in the UK and Germany, and on the economic effects of vertical mergers, for which he was awarded a doctorate by Oxford in 1998.

From 1994 to 2000 he held College Lecturerships in Economics, successively at Jesus College, Balliol College, St. Peter's College and Pembroke College.

From 2000 to 2002 he was a senior economist at PricewaterhouseCoopers in London, working on transfer pricing policy.

He is currently a Research Director at Oxford Forum, where he collaborates with Celia Green and Charles McCreery.

Books
In 1995 Tassano published The Power of Life or Death: Medical Coercion and the Euthanasia Debate. The book had a Foreword by Thomas Szasz, an American psychiatrist known for his libertarian views on mental illness, and was described by the philosopher Antony Flew as 'intellectually first-class'. The Power of Life or Death attempts to bring free-market and libertarian philosophical ideas into the medical ethics debate, in particular in relation to the treatment of the terminally ill, and examines the ideological subtext of the medical ethics literature, which Tassano argues often gives greater weight to collective interests than to the preferences of individual patients.  Despite its radical approach the book received serious, if guarded attention from the medical profession, the British Medical Journal, for example, commenting: 'We would not recommend this book as comfortable bedtime reading. ... If you like an intellectual challenge this one is for you.' The book was also reviewed in Nature, which commented, 'His view goes straight to the medical jugular', and the Literary Review, according to which 'Tassano presents hair-raising case studies [...] his book is a timely polemic.' The book was shortlisted for the Skrabanek Prize.

Tassano analyses the ideological content of modern culture in general in Mediocracy: Inversions and Deceptions in an Egalitarian Culture (2006), characterized by Patrick Minford as a book that 'delightfully dissects the language of modern egalitarianism and political correctness'. The book argues that both ‘dumbing down’ in the popular media, and the obscurantism prevalent in academic discourse, are manifestations of the same underlying ideology: one which appears egalitarian but in reality is designed to privilege a paternalistic elite and exclude those who might criticise it. Mediocracy received favourable reviews from a number of online commentators. Johnathan Pearce of the libertarian website Samizdata called it 'a rather fine book'. Curtis Yarvin described it as 'a comprehensive and witty dictionary'.

In 2019 Tassano published a collection of essays entitled The Ideology of the Elites.

Other selected publications
'Tax aspects of corporate activity', Energy Utilities, February 1996.
'Are vertical mergers harmful?’, European Competition Law Review, 7, 1999.
'Information Complexity as a Driver of Emergent Phenomena in the Business Community' (with J. Efstathiou et al.), Proceedings of the International Workshop on Emergent Synthesis, Kobe University, 1999.
Tax for the Terrified, Tassano & Co, 1994.

See also
 Egalitarianism

References

External links
 Tassano's website
 Tassano's blog
 ‘Flatter, wider, virtual corporations’, online paper on effects of internet on market structure, 2000.
 Article about mediocracy on German-language Wikipedia

1963 births
Alumni of Churchill College, Cambridge
British economists
British libertarians
Living people
German emigrants to the United Kingdom
Naturalised citizens of the United Kingdom